Alone: A Love Story is a book and podcast by Canadian writer and journalist Michelle Parise.

Background 
The memoir is a story written by Michelle Parise. The story is about how Parise's marriage fell apart due to an affair and how she coped with the changes in her life after the divorce. Parise and her ex-husband purchased houses across the street from each other and Parise begins dating again at the age of 40. The story is about relationships and what it means to be lonely. The podcast won a Gold at the New York Festivals Radio Awards in 2018.

Adaptions

References

External links 

 

2017 podcast debuts
Canadian podcasts
Podcasts adapted for other media
Books about women
Canadian memoirs